Melissa Grelo (born June 30, 1977) is a Canadian television personality, best known as a co-host of CP24 Breakfast and the moderator of The Social. Since August 2016, Grelo has been a co-host of CTV's national morning show Your Morning, along with Ben Mulroney.

Melissa has also recently launched marQ, a gender neutral, kids clothing line named after her daughter, Marquesa.

Her other roles have included coanchoring CTV's Olympic Morning during the 2010 Winter Olympics, and Toronto's annual Santa Claus Parade.

Originally a teacher, Grelo studied broadcast journalism at Seneca College after deciding to pursue a change of career. She subsequently worked as a reporter for CKVR-TV and CITY-TV before becoming cohost of CP24 Breakfast in 2009.

Grelo is of Portuguese and Filipina descent. With her husband Ryan Gaggi, Grelo gave birth to a girl, Marquesa, in 2014.

Personal life
Grelo's interests include travelling, reading, fitness training and horseback riding.

Controversies
On August 13, 2021, during an episode of The Social, Grelo participated to a controversial debate on the status of French in Canada. Among the other participants was Jan Wong, also known for her past controversial comments on French Canadians. The latter notably stated "I think Quebeckers as a tribe" during the panel. Many clichés, stereotypes and false informations were shared by the panelists, including Grelo. 

She notably stated that the Académie française is a kind of "language police," referring to the institution's rules on the appropriate uses of words. She has also stated that  the institution is in France and not Canada.

She has also claimed that French is not "dying, because there is about 300 million French speakers in the world". Critics of Grelo's statement point that while French might not be a dying language internationally, French specifically used in Quebec is declining as of 2021.

References

1977 births
Canadian people of Filipino descent
Canadian people of Portuguese descent
Canadian television news anchors
Canadian television reporters and correspondents
Canadian television talk show hosts
Canadian women television journalists
CTV Television Network people
Journalists from Toronto
Living people
Seneca College alumni